Chazé-Henry is a former commune in the Maine-et-Loire department of western France. On 15 December 2016, it was merged into the new commune Ombrée d'Anjou.

Notable people from Chazé-Henry
Gaston Davout was born in Chazé-Henry, and created his pseudonym Henri Chazé by reversing the name of his birthplace.

See also
 Communes of the Maine-et-Loire department

References

Chazehenry